Alf Gough (8 March 1888 – 22 April 1930) was an Australian rules footballer who played with South Melbourne in the Victorian Football League (VFL).

Football
Gough was a forward pocket and second rover for South Melbourne in their 1909 premiership team. He kicked South Melbourne's fourth and final goal, in the third quarter, which helped them secure a two-point win. In 1910 he did not miss a single game and he appeared in the opening 16 rounds of the 1911 VFL season.

He then spent some time in New South Wales, playing for Sydney club Paddington.  He returned to South Melbourne for one final season in 1915.

Notes

External links 

1888 births
1930 deaths
Australian rules footballers from Victoria (Australia)
Australian Rules footballers: place kick exponents
Leopold Football Club (MJFA) players
Sydney Swans players
Sydney Swans Premiership players
Paddington Australian Football Club players
One-time VFL/AFL Premiership players